Ezio Madonia (born 7 August 1966) is a retired Italian sprinter who specialized in the 100 metres, that won ten medals with the national relay team at the International athletics competitions and three at individual level.

He is the coach of Luminosa Bogliolo.

Biography
In 4 x 100 m relay he helped win bronze medals at the 1990 European Championships in Split, 1994 European Championships in Helsinki and 1995 World Championships in Gothenburg. The relay team finished seventh at the 1987 World Championships, fifth at the 1988 Olympic Games and fifth at the 1991 World Championships.

In 100 metres he took a silver medal at the 1987 Mediterranean Games and won the 1991 Mediterranean Games. His personal best time is 10.26 seconds, achieved in June 1990 in Arzignano. In 60 metres he finished fourth at the 1992 European Indoor Championships.

Achievements

National titles
He has won 3 times the individual national championship.
2 wins in the 100 metres (1991, 1993)
1 win in the 60 metres  indoor (1992)

See also
 Italy national relay team

References

External links
 

1966 births
Living people
People from Albenga
Italian male sprinters
Athletics competitors of Fiamme Gialle
Athletes (track and field) at the 1988 Summer Olympics
Athletes (track and field) at the 1996 Summer Olympics
Olympic athletes of Italy
World Athletics Championships medalists
European Athletics Championships medalists
Mediterranean Games gold medalists for Italy
Mediterranean Games silver medalists for Italy
Athletes (track and field) at the 1987 Mediterranean Games
Athletes (track and field) at the 1991 Mediterranean Games
World Athletics Championships athletes for Italy
Mediterranean Games medalists in athletics
Italian athletics coaches
Italian Athletics Championships winners
Sportspeople from the Province of Savona